The cobble elimia, scientific name †Elimia vanuxemiana, was a species of freshwater snails, aquatic gilled gastropod mollusks with an operculum in the family Pleuroceridae. This species was endemic to the United States. It is now extinct.

References

Elimia
Extinct gastropods
Gastropods described in 1843
Taxonomy articles created by Polbot